Massimi is a surname that refer to the *Massimo family, A branch of the princely House of Massimo, and one of the great aristocratic families of Rome, renowned for its influence on the politics, the church and the artistic heritage of the city. Some of the Family branch moved to what is now the Island of Corsica (In 1764 Corsica was secretly purchased by France from the Republic of Genoa).
Members of that family including *Pope Paschal I, Born Pascale Massimi (-824),was the bishop of Rome and ruler of the Papal States from 25 January 817 to his death in 824. As well as Bishop Felice de Massimi (1501–1573) and Cardinal Camillo Massimi (1620–1677). Other notable people with this name include:
Massimo Massimi (1877–1954), Italian Catholic cardinal
Beppo di Massimi (1875–1961), French Air Force Lieutenant, designer, entrepreneur and engineer he founded what was the first "French airline" route before the creation of Air France in 1933
Michela Massimi (born 1950), Italian philosopher of science
Pierre Jean Charles Massimi (born 1946-1983), Secrétaire général de la préfecture de la Haute-Corse
Xavier Massimi (born 1981), Mexican actor